Mahora is a suburb of the city of Hastings, in the Hawke's Bay region of New Zealand's eastern North Island.

Demographics

Mahora had a population of 8,106 at the 2018 New Zealand census, an increase of 879 people (12.2%) since the 2013 census, and an increase of 1,080 people (15.4%) since the 2006 census. There were 2,877 households, comprising 3,885 males and 4,221 females, giving a sex ratio of 0.92 males per female, with 1,770 people (21.8%) aged under 15 years, 1,515 (18.7%) aged 15 to 29, 3,426 (42.3%) aged 30 to 64, and 1,401 (17.3%) aged 65 or older.

Ethnicities were 72.2% European/Pākehā, 25.1% Māori, 7.2% Pacific peoples, 9.2% Asian, and 1.3% other ethnicities. People may identify with more than one ethnicity.

The percentage of people born overseas was 17.7, compared with 27.1% nationally.

Although some people chose not to answer the census's question about religious affiliation, 43.0% had no religion, 40.1% were Christian, 2.4% had Māori religious beliefs, 1.1% were Hindu, 0.9% were Muslim, 0.8% were Buddhist and 4.0% had other religions.

Of those at least 15 years old, 954 (15.1%) people had a bachelor's or higher degree, and 1,461 (23.1%) people had no formal qualifications. 624 people (9.8%) earned over $70,000 compared to 17.2% nationally. The employment status of those at least 15 was that 3,069 (48.4%) people were employed full-time, 903 (14.3%) were part-time, and 225 (3.6%) were unemployed.

Education

References

Suburbs of Hastings, New Zealand